New Year's Eve Live refers to the annual New Year's Eve television special broadcast by CNN since 2001.

New Year's Eve Live may refer to the following:

 New Year's Eve Live (Fox TV program), the New Year's Eve specials broadcast by Fox TV network from 1991 to 1992, and again from 2004 to 2013
 MTV New Year's Eve Live, an alternate name for MTV's New Year's Eve specials broadcast between 1981 and 2014